The 1944 United States presidential election in Vermont  took place on November 7, 1944, as part of the 1944 United States presidential election which was held throughout all 48 states. Voters chose three representatives, or electors to the Electoral College, who voted for president and vice president.

Vermont voted for the Republican nominee, former Governor Thomas E. Dewey of New York, over the Democratic nominee, incumbent President Franklin D. Roosevelt of New York. Dewey’s running mate was Governor John W. Bricker of Ohio, while Roosevelt ran with Senator Harry S. Truman of Missouri.

Dewey took 57.06% of the vote, to Roosevelt’s 42.93%, a margin of 14.12%.

Vermont historically was a bastion of liberal Northeastern Republicanism, and by 1944 the Green Mountain State had gone Republican in every presidential election since the founding of the Republican Party. From 1856 to 1940, Vermont had the longest streak of voting Republican of any state, having never voted Democratic before, and this tradition continued in 1944 with Dewey's decisive win.

Vermont had been one of only two states (along with nearby Maine) to reject Democrat Franklin D. Roosevelt in all four of his presidential campaigns, even in the nationwide Democratic landslides of 1932 and 1936.

However 1940 had been Roosevelt’s high point in Vermont. In 1940, Roosevelt had improved on his previous showings in Vermont, coming within 10 points of winning the state, and thus Dewey’s more comfortable win in 1944 represented a shift back toward the GOP. Dewey’s 57.06% of the popular vote in Vermont made it his fourth strongest state after Kansas, Nebraska and South Dakota.

Dewey carried ten of the state’s 14 counties, breaking 60% in 6 and 70% in Orange. However, the three northwestern counties of Vermont had been Democratic enclaves in an otherwise Republican state throughout the 1930s and 1940s, and Roosevelt once again won Chittenden County, Franklin County and Grand Isle County for the Democrats. Roosevelt also once again carried rural Essex County in the northeast of the state, as he had first done 4 years earlier.

Results

Results by county

See also
 United States presidential elections in Vermont

References

Vermont
1944
1944 Vermont elections